Sophie Trudeau is a Canadian musician. She is best known as a member of Godspeed You! Black Emperor, and co-founder (with Efrim Menuck and Thierry Amar) of Thee Silver Mt. Zion Memorial Orchestra & Tra-La-La Band. She also plays in a number of other bands, including Valley of the Giants and The Mile End Ladies String Auxiliary.

Biography

Trudeau first served as violinist for Godspeed You! Black Emperor on their first EP, Slow Riot for New Zerø Kanada, which was released in 1999. Trudeau went on later to co-found Thee Silver Mt. Zion Memorial Orchestra & Tra-La-La Band, where she serves as one of two principal violinists. Trudeau has also played the bass guitar on The "Pretty Little Lightning Paw" E.P., as well as trumpet on Horses in the Sky. She is also credited as playing violin on the Arcade Fire track "Wake Up" from their debut album Funeral.

Sharing the responsibility with the other six members, Trudeau sings with Thee Silver Mt. Zion Memorial Orchestra & Tra-La-La Band.

Trudeau was also the founder of Bangor Records. Its roster included her string trio project, The Mile End Ladies String Auxiliary, for which she played violin, along with Beckie Foon of Thee Silver Mt. Zion Memorial Orchestra & Tra-La-La Band on cello and Genevieve Heistek of Hangedup on viola.  Their first album, From Cells of Roughest Air, was released by Bangor Records on 1 January 2005. She was also a member of Diebold, a duo who released an album on Bangor in January 2007.

In 2006, Sophie, with Efrim Menuck and Thierry Amar, assisted in the recording of Carla Bozulich's first release for Constellation, Evangelista.

Discography

With Godspeed You! Black Emperor

 Slow Riot for New Zerø Kanada (1999)
 Lift Your Skinny Fists Like Antennas to Heaven (2000)
 Yanqui U.X.O. (2002)
 'Allelujah! Don't Bend! Ascend! (2012)
  'Asunder, Sweet and Other Distress'  (2015)
  'Luciferian Towers'  (2017)
  'G_d's Pee at State's End!'  (2021)

With A Silver Mt. Zion
 He Has Left Us Alone but Shafts of Light Sometimes Grace the Corner of Our Rooms... (2000)
 "Born into Trouble as the Sparks Fly Upward" (2001)
 "This Is Our Punk-Rock," Thee Rusted Satellites Gather + Sing, (2003)
 The "Pretty Little Lightning Paw" E.P. (2004)
 Horses in the Sky (2005)
 13 Blues for Thirteen Moons (2008)
 Kollaps Tradixionales (2010)
 Fuck Off Get Free We Pour Light on Everything (2014)

With Set Fire to Flames
 Sings Reign Rebuilder (2001)
 Telegraphs in Negative/Mouths Trapped in Static (2003)

With Valley of the Giants
 Valley of the Giants (2004)

With The Mile End Ladies String Auxiliary
 From Cells of Roughest Air (2005)

With Diebold
 Diebold (2007)
 Listen to My Heartbeast (2008)

With Kiss Me Deadly
 Misty Medley (2005)

With Wrekmeister Harmonies
 Light Falls'' (2016)

References

External links
 Allmusic album credits
 

Year of birth missing (living people)
Place of birth missing (living people)
Canadian rock singers
Canadian rock violinists
Godspeed You! Black Emperor members
Living people
Singers from Montreal
Thee Silver Mt. Zion members
Valley of the Giants (band) members
21st-century Canadian violinists and fiddlers
Canadian women violinists and fiddlers